Fermín Palacios was president of El Salvador, four times between 1844 and 1846. He was born in San Salvador.

External links
 Short biography

Presidents of El Salvador
Year of birth missing
Year of death missing
People from San Salvador
19th-century Salvadoran people